Phiarothrips is a genus of thrips in the family Phlaeothripidae.

Species
 Phiarothrips reperticus

References

Phlaeothripidae
Thrips
Thrips genera